Deadly Deception: General Electric, Nuclear Weapons and Our Environment is a 1991 American short documentary film directed by Debra Chasnoff. It won an Oscar at the 64th Academy Awards in 1992 for Documentary Short Subject.  It focuses on General Electric's role in producing nuclear weapons.

See also
 List of films about nuclear issues

References

External links

 Deadly Deception: General Electric, Nuclear Weapons and Our Environment at Groundspark
 Deadly Deception: General Electric, Nuclear Weapons and Our Environment at New Day Films

1991 films
1991 in the environment
1991 documentary films
American short documentary films
1990s short documentary films
American independent films
Best Documentary Short Subject Academy Award winners
Documentary films about nuclear war and weapons
General Electric
1991 independent films
1990s English-language films
1990s American films